Travelling with Pets (translit. Puteshestviye s domashnimi zhivotnymi) is a 2007 Russian drama film directed by Vera Storozheva. It won the Golden George at the 29th Moscow International Film Festival.

Cast
 Kseniya Kutepova as Natalia
 Dmitriy Dyuzhev as Sergei
 Evgeniy Knyazev as Priest
 Anna Mikhalkova as Klavdiya
 Vadim Afanassiev as Natalia's husband
 Sofiya Dudarchik as Olga
 Olga Popova as Paramedic
 Timofey Tribuntsev as Ment
 Aleksandr Oblasov as Security guard

References

External links

2007 films
2007 drama films
Russian drama films
2000s Russian-language films